Louis Edward "Lou" Curdes (2 November 1919 – 5 February 1995) was an American flying ace of the United States Army Air Forces during World War II who held the unusual distinction of scoring an official air-to-air kill against another American Aircraft. He was awarded the Distinguished Flying Cross twice and a Purple Heart. He flew a North American P-51 Mustang fighter aircraft with the nickname "Bad Angel".

Curdes was one of only three American pilots to shoot down aircraft belonging to the German, the Italian and Japanese air forces. He was also involved in an incident where he intentionally shot down an American cargo plane. In total, Curdes shot down seven German Messerschmitt Bf 109s, an Italian Macchi C.202 fighter, a Japanese Mitsubishi Ki-46 reconnaissance aircraft and an American Douglas C-47 Skytrain.

Early life
Louis Curdes was born on 2 November 1919, to Esther (nee Kover) and Walter Curdes, he grew up in Fort Wayne, Indiana, and enrolled at Purdue University. After three years of study, he joined the Army Reserve on 12 March 1942. He became a 2nd Lieutenant, graduating from Flying School on 3 December 1942, at Luke Field, Arizona at the age of 22 and was posted to the Mediterranean theater.

World War II

North Africa and Italy
He joined the 329th Fighter Group, a unit of the United States Army Air Forces but was transferred to the 82d Fighter Group, 95th Fighter Squadron, where he saw action in North Africa, Sardinia and Italy, flying a Lockheed P-38 Lightning. On 29 April 1943, he shot down three German Messerschmitt Bf 109 aircraft and damaged a fourth near Cape Bon, in Tunisia. 19 May,  he shot down two more Bf 109s near Villacidro, Sardinia. In less than a month of combat, Curdes became a flying ace.

On 24 June, he shot down an Italian Macchi C.202 over Sardinia. He damaged a German Bf 109 on 30 July over Pratica di Mare, Italy. His last two victories in Europe were two Bf 109s over Benevento, Italy.

Capture and escape
On 27 August 1943, Curdes was shot down whilst in combat with German aircraft over Salerno, Italy. He was captured by the Italians and sent to a prison camp near Rome. He may have been the 63rd victory of Luftwaffe   Franz Schieß of 8./JG 53. 
A few days later, the Italians signed an Armistice with the Allies. In response to this, Germany invaded its former ally. Curdes and some other pilots escaped before the Germans took control of the POW camp.

Curdes was repatriated to the US and returned to his hometown in Fort Wayne. Curdes requested a return to active duty and joined the 4th Fighter Squadron and the 3rd Air Commando in the Pacific in August 1944, flying the P-51 Mustang.

Pacific Campaign and shooting down an American aircraft
By November 1944, parts of the Philippines were again under US control. His unit, the 3rd Air Commando Group, had the task of bombing Japanese bases and providing support to ground troops. They also raided Japanese facilities along the coast of China and the island of Taiwan, providing escort duties to Allied ships, dropping supplies from the air, delivering mail, and evacuating the wounded.

On 10 February, Curdes, now a lieutenant, formed a squadron of four aircraft that departed from Mangaldan Airfield in the Philippines. Their objective was to investigate if the Japanese were using a temporary airstrip on the southern tip of Taiwan. No airfield could be found and Curdes returned to the Philippines. Flying over the island of Batan, the squadron split; Curdes and Lieutenant  Schmidtke headed north, while Lieutenants Scalley and La Croix headed south.  Scalley and La Croix located a small Japanese airfield and attacked it and also called for reinforcement, Curdes and Schmidtke headed south to join them.

During the attack on the airfield, La Croix was shot down and made an emergency landing in the sea. As the squadron circled, Curdes could see that his companion had survived, and remained in the area to guide a rescue plane and protect the downed pilot. While covering La Croix, Curdes noticed a larger plane preparing to land at the Batan airfield. He flew to investigate and found the aircraft to be a Douglas C-47 transport with US insignia. Curdes tried to make contact by radio but was not successful. He maneuvered his P-51 in front of the plane several times trying to get the C-47 to alter course, but the C-47 maintained its course.

Curdes reasoned that it was better to shoot down the aircraft rather than to allow the crew to be taken prisoners by the Japanese and fired into one of the C-47's two engines, causing it to fail. The C-47 maintained its course for the Batan airfield, so Curdes disabled the other engine, forcing the pilot to ditch in the sea. The plane successfully ditched without breaking up, and the crew was able to evacuate into a lifeboat. La Croix approached and was brought on board the C-47's life raft, where he was informed about the situation. The plane had apparently been lost in poor weather and its radio had stopped working. As it was also running out of fuel, the pilot headed directly to the island's airstrip, unaware that it was under Japanese control.

At this point, poor light and lack of fuel forced Curdes to return to base. The next morning, he accompanied the rescue PBY to pick up the downed C-47 pilot and 11 crew members, including two nurses, all of whom had survived the incident. To Curdes's surprise, he discovered that one of the nurses was a woman with whom he had had a date the night before the incident (Svetlana Valeria). She and Curdes were married in 1946. Contrary to subsequent reports, Curdes did not receive a Distinguished Flying Cross for that event, although he did receive credit for the "Kill" and displayed it on his aircraft.

His unit was later transferred to Gabu Airfield in Laoag, Philippines, from where he attacked Japanese positions in northern Luzon and Okinawa until the end of the war.

After the war
After World War II, he joined an Air National Guard unit at Baer Field and remained there until 1948. In Allen County, Indiana, 2 April 1946, he married Svetlana Valeria Curdes and returned to active duty, this time again with the United States Air Force. He flew Douglas C-54 Skymasters in the Berlin airlift during the opening stages of the Cold War.

He was promoted to major on 1 September 1951, and retired from the Air Force as a lieutenant colonel in October 1963. After his retirement, he started a construction company under the name of Curdes Builders Company.

Louis Curdes died on 5 February 1995, at the age of 75, and was buried at Lindenwood Cemetery in Fort Wayne. His widow Valeria died on 10 October 2013, at the age of 87.

A replica of his P-51 "Bad Angel" is currently in the Pima Air Museum in Tucson, Arizona.

References

United States Army Air Forces pilots of World War II
1995 deaths
1919 births
People from Fort Wayne, Indiana
Purdue University alumni
American World War II flying aces
Aviators from Indiana
Military personnel from Indiana
Recipients of the Distinguished Flying Cross (United States)
United States Army Air Forces officers
Indiana National Guard personnel
Businesspeople from Indiana